Mongolian is a Unicode block containing characters for dialects of Mongolian, Manchu, and Sibe languages. It is traditionally written in vertical lines , although the Unicode code charts cite the characters rotated to horizontal orientation as this is the orientation of glyphs in a font that supports layout in vertical orientation.

The block has dozens of variation sequences defined for standardized variants.

Block

Presentation forms 

Notes
[a] U+1878 used historically for Buryat.

Extensions for Sanskrit and Tibetan

Variations and vowel separation
The Mongolian Unicode block contains its own variation selectors (listed as format controls) for use with the traditional Mongolian alphabet:

 U+180B Mongolian free variation selector one (FVS1)
 U+180C Mongolian free variation selector two (FVS2)
 U+180D Mongolian free variation selector three (FVS3)
 U+180F Mongolian free variation selector four (FVS4)

Additional variations may be also available for traditional Mongolian script characters according to the context of the character, or by using a zero-width joiner (ZWJ, U+200D) and/or a zero width non-joiner (ZWNJ, U+200C) to select the specific form. The block also contains a format control named "Mongolian vowel separator" (MVS, U+180E).

History
The following Unicode-related documents record the purpose and process of defining specific characters in the Mongolian block:

References 

Unicode blocks